Knots Landing Reunion: Together Again is a 2005 American television special celebrating the 1979–1993 prime time soap opera Knots Landing. It aired on CBS on Friday, December 2, 2005 from 9:00 to 11:00 p.m. ET/PT.

Synopsis
A retrospective of Knots Landing was made after a similar reunion show, Dallas Reunion: The Return to Southfork, aired the previous year. Produced by the same team, the Knots Landing special reunited most of the original cast members who reminisced about their time working on the series. It also included clips from the show, as well as outtakes and bloopers. The special was filmed on location at the famous Knots Landing cul-de-sac "Seaview Circle" (in reality Crystalaire Place in Los Angeles), with interiors filmed at a newly made studio set reconstruction of the MacKenzie house.

Although not appearing with the main cast, separate segments with stars Alec Baldwin, Don Murray and Nicolette Sheridan were included. Julie Harris (who was in the original series until 1987) made a "surprise" appearance towards the end of the special, much to the delight of the other castmembers. The special actually aired on Harris's 80th birthday.

Knots Landing creator and executive producer David Jacobs (who also created Dallas) also recorded a segment for the special, as did his co-executive producer Michael Filerman. The two discussed how the series was originally created and its various changes throughout its fourteen-year run.

One segment of the special, featuring actors Ted Shackelford and Joan Van Ark on the front lawn of their Knots Landing house, was included as a bonus feature on the Knots Landing Season One DVD release in 2006. To date, no other part of the special (or whole) has been commercially released.

References

External links

2005 television specials
2000s American television specials
CBS television specials
Television series reunion specials
Dallas (TV franchise)